Rimantas Dichavičius (born 1 March 1937, Kelmė volost) is a Lithuanian photographer.

References

Lithuanian photographers
1937 births
Living people
20th-century Lithuanian male artists